Boy Waterman (born 24 January 1984) is a Dutch professional footballer who plays as a goalkeeper for PSV Eindhoven.

He was part of the Netherlands under-21 national team which won the 2007 Under-21 European Football Championship.

Club career
Waterman started his career at SC Heerenveen, debuting in 2004. After being loaned to AZ Alkmaar for half a year he completed a transfer in April 2007. On 10 February 2007, Waterman played his first Eredivisie match for AZ against Willem II. He made his European debut in AZ's 3–3 draw against Fenerbahçe (UEFA Cup) on 14 February 2007.

In August 2008, he was given by AZ Alkmaar on loan to ADO Den Haag. On 22 February 2010, he joined Viking FK on loan until August. However, the loan deal was cancelled because of a groin injury. After that period Waterman played for De Graafschap, again on loan from AZ Alkmaar.

In July 2011, he joined German club Alemannia Aachen, appearing in 30 competitive matches with the club. After Aachen was eventually relegated, he left on a free transfer to PSV Eindhoven. Waterman began the 2012–13 season as PSV's second-choice goalkeeper, behind Przemysław Tytoń. However, after five league games, Waterman was promoted to first-choice goalkeeper by manager Dick Advocaat.

On 9 July 2015, Waterman signed a two-year contract with Cypriot club APOEL FC. He made his APOEL debut on 14 July 2015, in his team's 0–0 home draw against FK Vardar for the second qualifying round of the UEFA Champions League. At the end of the season he crowned champion for the first time in his career, as APOEL managed to win the Cypriot First Division title for a fourth time in the row. On 15 May 2017, Waterman signed a two-year contract extension with APOEL, running until June 2019.

On 24 August 2020, he joined OFI on a free transfer.

International career
Born in the Netherlands, Waterman is of Surinamese descent. In 2007 Waterman was called up by Jong Oranje coach Foppe de Haan to be part of his squad for the 2007 UEFA European Under-21 Football Championship held in the Netherlands. Waterman was De Haan's first goalkeeper for the tournament and helped his team in their first match against Israel to a 1–0 victory. He also started in their second match against Portugal but was substituted by Kenneth Vermeer in the first half with a back injury. The match against Portugal was eventually won and the Dutch managed to qualify for the semi finals of the tournament as well as for the 2008 Summer Olympics. In the semi finals Waterman returned on the pitch and The Netherlands eliminated England after a 1–1 draw with 13–12 in a penalty shootout with 32 penalty kicks taken, with Waterman stopping three English penalties and scoring one himself. The Dutch went on to retain their 2006 title by beating Serbia 4–1 in the final.

Career statistics

Honours
PSV
Johan Cruyff Shield: 2012, 2022

APOEL
Cypriot First Division: 2015–16, 2016–17, 2017–18, 2018–19
Cypriot Super Cup: 2019

Netherlands U21
UEFA European Under-21 Championship: 2007

References

External links
 
 
 
 Boy Waterman Interview

1984 births
Living people
Dutch sportspeople of Surinamese descent
Footballers from Lelystad
Dutch footballers
Association football goalkeepers
Netherlands under-21 international footballers
Netherlands youth international footballers
SC Heerenveen players
AZ Alkmaar players
ADO Den Haag players
De Graafschap players
Alemannia Aachen players
PSV Eindhoven players
Kardemir Karabükspor footballers
APOEL FC players
OFI Crete F.C. players
Eredivisie players
2. Bundesliga players
Süper Lig players
Cypriot First Division players
Super League Greece players
Dutch expatriate footballers
Dutch expatriate sportspeople in Germany
Expatriate footballers in Germany
Dutch expatriate sportspeople in Turkey
Expatriate footballers in Turkey
Dutch expatriate sportspeople in Cyprus
Expatriate footballers in Cyprus
Dutch expatriate sportspeople in Greece
Expatriate footballers in Greece